Pat Campbell is an Australian cartoonist.

Born in Canberra, Campbell completed a Bachelor of Arts degree from the Australian National University in 1993. He subsequently began working casually as a freelance artist for The Canberra Times.

Campbell has worked full-time for The Canberra Times since 1998, as a cartoonist and illustrator.

In addition to this employment with The Canberra Times, Campbell continued to work as a freelance illustrator. His work has appeared in publications such as CHOICE magazine, Australian Macworld, Victorian Law Journal, as well as for institutions such as Questacon, the National Museum of Australia, and the Australian War Memorial.

Awards and recognition
Campbell won the 2013 Walkley Award for Artwork. He has won six Stanley Awards as voted by his peers in the Australian Cartoonists' Association. This includes Stanley Awards for Single Gag (1998, 2004), Humorous Illustrator (2000, 2002), Illustrator (2014) and Media Graphic Artist (2008). Campbell has also won the Australian Cartoonists' Association's Bill Mitchell Award for Young Cartoonists (1992), and a Rotary Cartoon Award for best political cartoon (2010)

References

External links
 Canberra Times gallery - collection of Pat Campbell's editorial cartoons, displayed in reverse-chronological order
 Pat's Cartoons - Pat Campbell's Facebook page

Australian editorial cartoonists
Living people
The Canberra Times people
Year of birth missing (living people)